Carex fusiformis is a tussock-forming species of perennial sedge in the family Cyperaceae. It is native to parts of the Himalayas including Nepal.

See also
List of Carex species

References

fusiformis
Plants described in 1834
Taxa named by Christian Gottfried Daniel Nees von Esenbeck
Flora of Nepal